There are many dance companies in Canada. Listed are some of the professional dance companies.

List

Notes 

The Canadian Encyclopedia lists some other companies:

References

Further reading
 

Dance-related lists
Lists of companies of Canada